Derbyshire County Cricket Club in 1949 represents the cricket season when the English club Derbyshire had been playing for seventy-eight years. It was their forty-fifth  season in the County Championship and they  won six matches in the County Championship to finish in fifteenth place.

1949 season

Derbyshire played 26 matches in the County Championship and one against the touring New Zealanders. DA Skinner was captain. Charlie Elliott scored most runs, and Cliff Gladwin took most wickets with 110 in the Championship.

Laurie Johnson, who went on to become a major performer for the county, made his debut in 1949 while fellow West Indian Michael Frederick also made his debut, but only took part in two first class matches. Dick Sale and Tom Hall played in their first of several seasons for the club, as did George Lowe although he appeared intermittently. Joseph Rimmer and Maurice Snape made their only appearances for Derbyshire in two matches in the season, while Kenneth Shearwood appeared once as a stop-gap wicket-keeper.

Matches

{| class="wikitable" width="100%"
! bgcolor="#efefef" colspan=6 | List of  matches
|- bgcolor="#efefef"
!No.
!Date
!V
!Result 
!Margin
!Notes
 |- 
|1
|14 May 1949 
 | SomersetCounty Ground, Derby 
|bgcolor="#00FF00"|Won 
| 10 wickets
|    AEG Rhodes 5-49; 
|- 
|2
|21 May 1949  
| LeicestershireBath Grounds, Ashby-de-la-Zouch 
|bgcolor="#00FF00"|Won 
| 153 runs
|    AC Revill  156; Symington 5-45; C Gladwin 5-28; Walsh 5-105 
|- 
|3
| 25 May 1949 
|  Surrey Kennington Oval 
|bgcolor="#FF0000"|Lost 
|Innings and 182 runs 
|    Squires 210; Bedser 6-25 
|- 
|4
|28 May 1949  
| Yorkshire  Queen's Park, Chesterfield 
|bgcolor="#FF0000"|Lost 
|114 runs
|    Coxon 6-36 
|- 
|5
|01 Jun 1949 
|  Sussex     Rutland Recreation Ground, Ilkeston 
 |bgcolor="#FFCC00"|Drawn
| 
|    John Langridge 234  
|- 
|6
|04 Jun 1949 
| Warwickshire Edgbaston, Birmingham 
|bgcolor="#FF0000"|Lost 
| 1 wicket
|    Dollery 100 
|- 
|7
|08 Jun 1949 
| Leicestershire  County Ground, Derby 
 |bgcolor="#FFCC00"|Drawn
| 
|    Berry 149; Prentice 117; HL Jackson 7-51 
|- 
|8
|11 Jun 1949  
|  WorcestershireQueen's Park, Chesterfield 
|bgcolor="#FF0000"|Lost 
| 100 runs
|    Howorth 6-57; C Gladwin 8-72 
|- 
|9
|18 Jun 1949 
 |  Gloucestershire   Ashley Down Ground, Bristol 
|bgcolor="#FF0000"|Lost 
| Innings and 1 run
|    Goddard 6-46 and 9-61; AEG Rhodes 7-114 
|- 
|10
|22 Jun 1949 
| Kent Queen's Park, Chesterfield 
|bgcolor="#FF0000"|Lost 
| 116 runs
|    C Gladwin 5-41 
|- 
|11
|25 Jun 1949 
| Lancashire   Park Road Ground, Buxton 
|bgcolor="#00FF00"|Won 
| 110 runs
|    HL Jackson 6-52; Tattersall 6-39 
|- 
|12
|29 Jun 1949 
| Essex   Chalkwell Park, Westcliff-on-Sea 
|bgcolor="#00FF00"|Won 
| 8 wickets
|    Pearce 111; C Gladwin 5-36 and 5-52; Price 5-47; W H Copson 5-43
|- 
|13
|02 Jul 1949  
|  Sussex    Manor Sports Ground, Worthing 
 |bgcolor="#FFCC00"|Drawn
| 
|    John Langridge 146 and 146 
|- 
|14
|06 Jul 1949 
| Hampshire  Queen's Park, Chesterfield 
|bgcolor="#FF0000"|Lost 
| 10 wickets
|    Carty 5-43; Shackleton 7-90 
|- 
|15
|09 Jul 1949  
| New Zealand   
|bgcolor="#FF0000"|Lost 
| 7 wickets
|    AC Revill 145; Burke 6-23  
|- 
|16
|16 Jul 1949  
| Glamorgan   Cardiff Arms Park 
|bgcolor="#FF0000"|Lost 
| 6 wickets
|    Clift 125; HL Jackson ; Muncer 5-68 
|- 
|17
|20 Jul 1949  
| SomersetCounty Ground, Taunton 
|bgcolor="#00FF00"|Won 
| Innings and 146 runs
|    AEG Rhodes 127; Hazell ; W H Copson 5-34; HL Jackson 6-43 
|- 
|18
|23 Jul 1949  
| Nottinghamshire    Rutland Recreation Ground, Ilkeston 
 |bgcolor="#FFCC00"|Drawn
| 
|    Keeton 101; AEG Rhodes 126; Butler 5-56 
|- 
|19
|30 Jul 1949  
| Warwickshire  County Ground, Derby 
 |bgcolor="#FFCC00"|Drawn
| 
|     
|- 
|20
|03 Aug 1949  
|  Gloucestershire  Queen's Park, Chesterfield 
|bgcolor="#FF0000"|Lost 
| 184 runs
|    C Gladwin 5-53; Cook 5-40; DB Carr ; Graveney 10-66 
|- 
|21
|06 Aug 1949 
| Lancashire   Old Trafford, Manchester 
 |bgcolor="#FFCC00"|Drawn
| 
|    R Sale 146; C Gladwin 5-105 
|- 
|22
|10 Aug 1949 
| Northamptonshire   County Ground, Northampton 
|bgcolor="#FF0000"|Lost 
| Innings and 80 runs
|    Jakeman 160; HL Jackson 5-99
|- 
|23
|13 Aug 1949  
| YorkshirePark Avenue Cricket Ground, Bradford 
|bgcolor="#FF0000"|Lost 
| 6 wickets
|    Ted Lester 140; JD Eggar  219; Coxon 5-48 
|- 
|24
|17 Aug 1949 
| Middlesex   County Ground, Derby 
|bgcolor="#FF0000"|Lost 
| Innings and 95 runs
|    Sims 5-105 
|- 
|25
|20 Aug 1949 
| Nottinghamshire    Trent Bridge, Nottingham 
 |bgcolor="#FFCC00"|Drawn
| 
|    C Gladwin 125; Poole 122; Harvey 7-105 
|- 
|126
|24 Aug 1949  
| Middlesex     Lord's Cricket Ground, St John's Wood 
|bgcolor="#FF0000"|Lost 
| 3 wickets
|    Young 5-80; Warr 5-36 
|- 
|27
|27 Aug 1949  
| Essex   Ind Coope Ground, Burton-on-Trent 
|bgcolor="#00FF00"|Won 
| Innings and 149 runs
|    W H Copson 5-23; C Gladwin 5-28 
|- 
|

Statistics

County Championship batting averages

County Championship bowling averages

Wicket Keepers
GO Dawkes 	Catches 60, Stumping 6 
 KA Shearwood  Catches 0, Stumping 1

See also
Derbyshire County Cricket Club seasons
1949 English cricket season

References

1949 in English cricket
Derbyshire County Cricket Club seasons